Densar is a poorly attested Bayono–Awbono language spoken in the highlands of Papua Province, Indonesia. Glottolog tentatively groups it with Awbono.

All that is known of Densar is a few dozen words given in Wilbrink (2004). The language had been recorded by Wilbrink during a sago grub festival in Seradela District, Yahukimo Regency in April 2001.

Vocabulary
A 42-word list of Densar is provided by Wilbrink (2004).

{| class="wikitable sortable"
! no. !! gloss !! Densar
|-
| 1 || head || ˈbabi
|-
| 2 || hair || babaˈmina
|-
| 3 || eye || s̪uˈki
|-
| 4 || ear || kɔbuˈka
|-
| 5 || nose || bɔnteˈmɔn
|-
| 6 || mouth || bɔʰɔmˈka
|-
| 8 || tooth || iˈbi
|-
| 9 || tongue || ˈkibʏn
|-
| 10 || upper arm || ˈdimɾʏ
|-
| 11 || elbow || dɪˈdamu
|-
| 12 || finger || dɪˈdja
|-
| 13 || fingernail || dɪˈɾa
|-
| 14 || breast || ʔaˈma
|-
| 15 || stomach || s̪ɪŋˈkɛ
|-
| 16 || liver || guˈmɔ
|-
| 17 || leg || neˈqa
|-
| 20 || skin || [digjɔ]qa
|-
| 21 || blood || t̪ɵˈɾɔ
|-
| 22 || bone || kuˈɾa/[dɪˈba]kɵˈɾu
|-
| 23 || flesh || ˈjabe
|-
| 97 || stone || tuum
|-
| 101 || water || ɒ
|-
| 103 || river || ɒ
|-
| 104 || lake || ɒkuɾɪŋjæn
|-
| 112 || star || qaniˈni
|-
| 113 || fire || ni
|-
| 114 || smoke || tiŋˈgɔ
|-
| 154 || one || jã
|-
| 155 || two || ˈjãmɾʏ
|-
| 156 || three || bɾʊmˈɾʊ/ˈbɾʊmɾʊ
|-
| 157 || four || ʔɔˈtɛɛmɾʊ
|-
| 158 || five || ʔɔˈtɔgwa
|-
| 159 || six || gɔˈtɔŋwa
|-
| 160 || seven || gɔˈgɔga
|-
| 161 || eight || ˈogbenugwa
|-
| 162 || nine || mɔˈtuʷga
|-
| 163 || ten || ɵˈmɪŋga
|-
| 179 || wet || ɒt̪aɾiˈɾi
|-
| 222 || burn (intr.) || aɾudɪhɪnjã
|-
| 240 || heart || guˈmɔ
|-
| 253 || heavy || kɔ̃n
|-
| 269 || sick || tuˈkɾu
|}

References

Bayono–Awbono languages